Haddon is a surname. Notable people with the surname include:

A
 Alfred Cort Haddon (1855–1940), British anthropologist
 April Haddon, fictional character
 Arthur Langan Haddon (1895-1961), New Zealand Church of Christ minister
 Arthur Trevor Haddon (1864-1941), British painter

C
 Caroline Haddon (1837-1905), philosophical writer
 Celia Haddon (born 1944), British journalist and writer

D
 Damita Haddon (born 1971), American gospel singer
 Dayle Haddon (born 1948), Canadian model and actress
 Deitrick Haddon (born 1973), American gospel singer

E
 Elizabeth Haddon (1680–1762), American colonist and Quaker

F
 Frederick William Haddon (1839-1906), Australian journalist and newspaper editor

H
 Harry Haddon (born 1871), English professional footballer

J
 James Haddon (fl. 1556), English clergyman
 Jenny Haddon (born 1933), English writer of romance novels under the name Sophie West

K
 Kathleen Haddon (1888-1961), British scholar of string-figures

L
 Laurence Haddon (1922–2013), American television actor
 Lloyd Haddon (born 1938), American hockey player

M
 Mark Haddon (born 1962), English novelist

O
 Oriwa Tahupotiki Haddon (1898-1958), New Zealand Methodist minister

P
 Peter Haddon (1898-1962), English actor

R
 Robert Joseph Haddon (1866-1929), English born Australian architect
 Robert Tahupotiki Haddon (1866-1936) New Zealand Methodist minister 
 Ryan Haddon (born 1971), journalist and TV producer

S
 Sam E. Haddon (born 1937), United States federal judge

T
 Thomas Haddon (1913-1993), British soldier
 Trevor Haddon (1864-1941), British painter

V 
 Vivien Haddon (born 1945), New Zealand swimmer

W
 Walter Haddon (1515-1572), English civil lawyer
 Dr. William Haddon Jr., the inventor of the Haddon Matrix, the most common tool in the injury prevention field